The Ultimate Peter Allen is a greatest hits album by Australian singer-songwriter Peter Allen, released in Australia in July 2006 through Universal Music Australia.

Track listing
 "Not the Boy Next Door" (Dean Pitchford, Peter Allen) – 6:55
 "Don't Wish Too Hard" (Carole Bayer Sager, Allen) – 3:37
 "Quiet Please, There's a Lady on Stage" (Sager, Allen) – 5:13
 "I'd Rather Leave While I'm in Love" (Sager, Allen) – 3:40
 "Everything Old Is New Again" (Sager, Allen) – 2:38
 "I Honestly Love You" (Jeff Barry, Allen) – 3:36
 "I Still Call Australia Home" (single version) (Allen) – 3:57
 "Don't Cry Out Loud" (Sager, Allen) – 4:07
 "Tenterfield Saddler" (album version) (Allen) – 3:35
 "I Go to Rio" (album version) (Adrienne Anderson, Allen) – 3:23
 "The More I See You" (album version) (Harry Warren, Mack Gordon) – 3:35
 "One Step Over the Borderline" (album version) (David Foster, Allen, Tom Keane) – 3:47
 "Bi-Coastal" (Foster, Allen, Keane) – 4:20
 "She Loves to Hear Music" (album version) (Sager, Allen) – 3:21
 "Once Before I Go" (Pitchford, Allen) – 4:24
 "Continental American" (album version) (Sager, Allen) – 4:32
 "Fly Away" (Sager, David Foster, Allen) – 3:59
 "I Could Have Been a Sailor" (Allen) – 3:53
 "Just Ask Me I've Been There" (album version) (Allen) – 3:33
 "Love Crazy" (Anderson, Allen) – 3:18

Charts
The Ultimate Peter Allen peaked at number 50 in 2006, but re-entered the charts at number 24 following the screening of the first part of the 2015 mini-series Peter Allen: Not the Boy Next Door. It peaked at number 18 following the screening of the second and final part.

Weekly charts

Release history

References

Peter Allen (musician) albums
2006 greatest hits albums
Albums produced by David Foster
Universal Records compilation albums
Compilation albums by Australian artists